The Baekje–Tang War was fought between Baekje and the allied forces of Tang China and Silla between 660 and 663. It was in some respect a spillover of the, at the time, ongoing Goguryeo–Tang War. After numerous attacks and raids by the combined forces of Baekje and Goguryeo, King Muyeol of Silla sought help from Emperor Gaozong of Tang to aid his exhausted kingdom. Emperor Gaozong granted his request and launched the invasion of Baekje in 660. After the conquest of Baekje later that year, loyalist forces from Baekje with the aid of Yamato allies attempted to resist the occupation of their kingdom until the two allied forces were destroyed in 663.

Background
The Silla kingdom had formed a military alliance with the Tang empire under Emperor Gaozong's reign. When Goguryeo and Baekje attacked Silla from the north and west respectively, Queen Seondeok of Silla had sent an emissary to the Tang empire to desperately request military assistance. In 650, Emperor Gaozong received a poem, written by Queen Seondeok, from the princely emissary Kim Chunchu (who would later accede the Silla throne as King Muyeol). Baekje had allied with Yamato Wa in 653. Even though Baekje was allied with Goguryeo, the Han River valley separated the two states and was a hindrance in coming to each other's aid in time of war. King Muyeol assumed the Silla throne in 654. Between 655 and 659, the border of Silla was harassed by Baekje and Goguryeo; Silla therefore requested assistance from Tang.

Course of the war
In 658, Emperor Gaozong had sent an army to attack Goguryeo. Shortly afterwards, in 660, he sent a Tang army towards Baekje to further relieve Silla. It comprised 130,000 troops. During this expedition, Admiral Su Dingfang commanded the Tang fleet and sailed it straight towards Baekje. The Tang fleet sailed across the Yellow Sea, towards Geum River, and landed its army on the western coastline of Baekje. After the landing of the army, the Tang troops marched further towards Sabi, the capital of Baekje. 

Crown Prince Kim Beopmin, General Kim Yusin, General Kim Pumil, and General Kim Heumsun were dispatched with a Silla army and set off westwards into the Battle of Hwangsanbeol. It comprised 50,000 troops. They marched into Baekje from the eastern border, and crossed through Sobaek Mountains. General Kim Yusin led the Silla army across the passes of Tanhyon towards Hwangsan Plain, but General Gyebaek could only muster a force of about 5,000 Baekje troops in defense against the advancing Silla army. At Hwangsan Plain, the Silla army defeated the Baekje forces of General Gyebaek.

In 660, the Baekje capital Sabi fell to the forces of Tang and Silla. Around 10,000 Baekje troops were killed in the siege. Baekje was conquered on 18 July 660, when King Uija of Baekje surrendered at Ungjin. The Tang army took the king, crown prince, 93 officials, and 20,000 troops as prisoner.

Aftermath
The king and crown prince of Baekje were sent as hostages to the Tang empire. The Tang empire annexed the territory and established five military administrations to control the region instead of Silla, which they painfully accepted.

Course of resistance
In a final effort, General Gwisil Boksin led the resistance against Tang occupation of Baekje. He requested military assistance from their Yamato allies. In 661, Empress Saimei (who previously reigned as Empress Kōgyoku) and Prince Naka no Ōe prepared for battle and sent Prince Buyeo Pung of Baekje, who had been in Yamato Wa for over 30 years, to aid the resistance. In 662, they sent an expedition to assist General Gwisil Boksin. A year later, 27,000 Yamato troops were sent as reinforcements. The Tang fleet, comprising 170 ships, advanced towards Chuyu and encircled the city at Baekgang River. 

In 663 at the battle of Baekgang, the Baekje resistance and Yamato forces were annihilated by the Tang and Silla forces. As the Yamato fleet engaged the Tang fleet throughout the course of two days, they were eventually worn down by the Tang fleet and were destroyed in a decisive counterattack. During the engagement, General Echi no Takutsu was slain. Prince Buyeo Pung of Baekje and few of his men fled to Goguryeo.

See also
Goguryeo–Tang War
Silla–Tang War
Protectorate General to Pacify the East

References

Bibliography
 
 
 
 
 
 
 

660s conflicts
Baekje
Wars involving the Tang dynasty
Wars involving Silla
660s